Chishma (Şişmä) is a rural locality (a village) in Adzitarovsky Selsoviet, Karmaskalinsky District, Bashkortostan, Russia. The population was 84 as of 2010. There are 2 streets.

Geography 
Chishma is located 51 km southwest of Karmaskaly (the district's administrative centre) by road. Novomryasovo is the nearest rural locality.

References 

Rural localities in Karmaskalinsky District